High Pole Hill is a mountain in Barnstable County, Massachusetts. It is in the Town of Provincetown. Mount Gilboa is located east-northeast of High Pole Hill. It is the location of Provincetown’s iconic Pilgrim Monument.

References

Mountains of Massachusetts
Mountains of Barnstable County, Massachusetts